Xicat Interactive was a video game publisher with distribution across Europe and North America. Xicat held several significant licenses, including
Gothic; Motor Trend; Jane's Combat Simulations; and Guns & Ammo.

Games published/distributed

The Amazing Virtual Sea Monkeys
Ballistics
Big Mountain 2000Black Belt ChallengeBlack Stone: Magic & SteelCarmageddon TDR 2000CarrierCharge 'n BlastCulturesCoaster WorksCowHunterDemonworld: Dark ArmiesFila World TennisFlight UnlimitedF/A-18 Precision Strike FighterGothicHaven: Call of the KingHot WiredIncomingInvaderIron AcesIron Aces 2: Birds of PreyJane's Attack SquadronLarry Ragland's 4x4 ChallengeLotus ChallengeMetal DungeonRally Challenge 2000Sniper: Path of VengeanceTakedaTop Angler: Real Bass FishingU.S. Special Forces: Team FactorWetrixX-Plane 6Zanzarah: The Hidden Portal''

References

External links

Defunct video game companies of the United Kingdom
Video game companies established in 2000
Video game publishers